Tile Ridge (Rid Tile ) is a partly ice-free ridge of elevation 240 m in Dryanovo Heights, Greenwich Island in the South Shetland Islands, Antarctica.

The ridge is named after the ancient Tile (Tylis), capital town of the Celtic Kingdom in Thrace, 279–213 BC, and ancestor of the present Bulgarian settlement of Tulovo near Stara Zagora City.

Location

See also
 List of Bulgarian toponyms in Antarctica

Maps
 L.L. Ivanov et al. Antarctica: Livingston Island and Greenwich Island, South Shetland Islands. Scale 1:100000 topographic map. Sofia: Antarctic Place-names Commission of Bulgaria, 2005.
 L.L. Ivanov. Antarctica: Livingston Island and Greenwich, Robert, Snow and Smith Islands. Scale 1:120000 topographic map.  Troyan: Manfred Wörner Foundation, 2009.

References
 Tile Ridge. SCAR Composite Antarctic Gazetteer
 Bulgarian Antarctic Gazetteer. Antarctic Place-names Commission. (details in Bulgarian, basic data in English)

External links
 Tile Ridge. Copernix satellite image

Ridges of Greenwich Island